Aleksandr Tarasov may refer to the following people:
Alexander Tarasov (born 1958), Russian sociologist, politologist, culturologist, publicist, writer, and philosopher
Alexander Tarasov-Rodionov (1885–1938), Russian writer
Alexander Tarasov (figure skater) (born 1961), Russian pair skater 
Alexander Tarasov (ice hockey) (born 1990), Russian ice hockey defenceman
Aleksandr Tarasov (footballer) (born 1972), Russian football player
Aleksandr Tarasov (pentathlete) (1927–1984), Soviet modern pentathlete